Fentonia macroparabolica is a moth in the  family Notodontidae. It is found in Taiwan.

The wingspan is 47–55 mm.

References

Moths described in 1973
Notodontidae